Fritz Schollmeyer (born 19 June 1922) is a German former football manager.

References 
 

1922 births
Possibly living people
German football managers
BC Augsburg managers
Tennis Borussia Berlin managers
VfL Wolfsburg managers
Wormatia Worms managers
K. Beringen F.C. managers
Bonner SC managers
West German football managers